The Canton of Le Ribéral is a French canton of Pyrénées-Orientales department, in Occitanie. At the French canton reorganisation which came into effect in March 2015, the canton was created including 5 communes from the canton of Saint-Estève, 1 from the canton of Millas and 1 from the canton of Rivesaltes.

Composition 
Baho
Baixas
Calce
Peyrestortes
Pézilla-la-Rivière
Saint-Estève
Villeneuve-la-Rivière

References

Riberal